Dortmund Signal-Iduna-Park is a railway station on the Dortmund–Soest railway situated close to Signal Iduna Park stadium (also known as Westfalenstadion) in Dortmund in western Germany. The station was called Dortmund Westfalenhalle before December 2006. It is served by regional railway lines of Deutsche Bahn.

Rail services

When Borussia Dortmund play home games, the Dortmund-Sauerland-Express makes additional stops at this station.

References

Railway stations in Dortmund
Railway stations in Germany opened in 1952